Coleman Falls is an unincorporated community in northern Bedford County, Virginia, United States. The community is located along the James River and U.S. Route 501, between Big Island and Boonsboro. It is part of the Lynchburg Metropolitan Statistical Area.

History
The community was named after a family from the area in 1923.

Geography

Government
The United States Postal Service operates the Coleman Falls Post Office within the community. The post office has the ZIP Code of 24536. Big Island and Lynchburg Zip Codes are used for some properties in the community.

Education
The community is served by Bedford County Public Schools. Public school students residing in Coleman Falls are zoned to attend either Big Island Elementary School, Liberty Middle School, and Liberty High School or Boonsboro Elementary School, Forest Middle School, and Jefferson Forest High School.

The closest higher education institutions are located in Bedford and Lynchburg.

Infrastructure
The Coleman Falls Dam, operated by the Georgia-Pacific Corporation, is located in the community.

Public safety
Law enforcement is provided by the Bedford County Sheriff's Office. Fire protection is provided by the Big Island Volunteer Fire Company and Boonsboro Volunteer Fire and Rescue Company. Emergency medical services are provided by the Bedford County Department of Fire and Rescue, Big Island Emergency Crew, and Boonsboro Volunteer Fire and Rescue Company.

Transportation

Air
The Lynchburg Regional Airport is the closest airport with commercial service to the community.

Highways
 U.S. Route 501 (Lee Jackson Highway)

Rail
The CSX operated James River Subdivision runs through the community. The closest passenger rail service is located in Lynchburg.

References

Unincorporated communities in Bedford County, Virginia